The 2004 NCAA Division I Field Hockey Championship was the 24th women's collegiate field hockey tournament organized by the National Collegiate Athletic Association, to determine the top college field hockey team in the United States. The Wake Forest Demon Deacons won their third consecutive championship, defeating the Duke Blue Devils in the final, a rematch of the previous year's finale. The semifinals and championship were hosted by Wake Forest University at Kentner Stadium in Winston-Salem, North Carolina.

Bracket

References 

2004
Field Hockey
2004 in women's field hockey
2004 in sports in North Carolina